Spermbirds are a German punk band from Kaiserslautern. Formed in 1982, by the members of the melodic punk rock band Die Walter Elf (including an American G.I. stationed in Germany as vocalist), they created a fast hardcore punk group that gained popularity in Germany and beyond. 

Spermbirds’ most successful album was their 1986 debut, Something to Prove, which drew influence from many American hardcore punk bands. The cover features a picture of Cerebus the Aardvark created by Canadian comic book author Dave Sim. Sim made mention of the album in his widely column in Cerebus, saying that although the band had not obtained permission to use his artwork, he would not harass them with legal action. 

Spermbirds split up in 1990, but reformed later in 1993 releasing a number of albums and touring up to this date.

Discography

Singles
Don't Forget the Fun 7" EP split with Die Walter Elf (1985, X-Mist Records)
Get on the Stage / My Brother live 7" (1987, We Bite Records) Limited To 500 Copies Only

Studio albums
Something to Prove (1986, We Bite Records)
Nothing Is Easy (1987, We Bite Records)
Common Thread (1990, X-Mist Records)
Eating Glass (1992, X-Mist Records)
Joe (1992, X-Mist Records)
Shit For Sale (1994, G.U.N. Records)
Family Values (1995, G.U.N. Records)
Set An Example (2004, Common Thread Records)
A Columbus Feeling (2010, Rookie Records)
Go To Hell Then Turn Left (2019, Rookie Records)

Live albums
Thanks (1990, Dead-Eye Records)
Get Off the Stage (1996, G.U.N. Records)

Compilation album
Coffee, Hair and Real Life (1997)

DVD
Spermbirds: Me and My People DVD (2007, Rookie Records)

References

External links
Spermbirds' official website
Spermbirds' fan page
Spermbirds' YouTube
Spermbirds' MySpace
Spermbirds' iTunes

German punk rock groups
Musical groups established in 1982
1982 establishments in West Germany